Latitude 55° is a 1982 Canadian drama/adventure film.

Plot 
Wanda Woodsworth (Andrée Pelletier), a field worker for the Department of Culture, is on her way home to the city after a winter assignment in the northern part of Alberta. Her car breaks down on the deserted highway and as the weather worsens she finds herself stranded in the middle of a blizzard. Her initial calm gives way to anxiety and eventually to panic as she desperately tries to stay awake and alive. At the height of the blizzard, Wanda is rescued by a local potato farmer, Joseph Przysiezny (August Schellenberg), who carries her to a dilapidated shack nearby. For two days and two nights, while waiting for the blizzard to pass, two people stalk each other restlessly, inexorably, with humour and passion, in a painfully revealing series of confrontations that runs the gamut from mistrust and terror to physical intimacy and almost religious ecstasy.

Recognition 
 1983
 Genie Award for Best Achievement in Art Direction – Richard Hudolin
 Genie Award for Best Achievement in Costume Design – Wendy Partridge
 Genie Award for Best Performance by an Actor in a Leading Role – August Schellenberg
 Genie Award for Best Performance by an Actress in a Leading Role – Andrée Pelletier
 Genie Award for Best Original Screenplay – John Juliani, Sharon Riis

External links 
 National Film Board of Canada profile
 
 

1982 films
1980s adventure drama films
English-language Canadian films
Canadian adventure drama films
1982 drama films
1980s English-language films
1980s Canadian films